The Pointe des Grands is a mountain of the Mont Blanc Massif, located on the border between France and Switzerland, north-west of the Aiguille du Tour.

The mountain overlooks the Glacier des Grands on its (Swiss) northern side.

References

External links
 Pointe des Grands on Hikr

Mountains of the Alps
Alpine three-thousanders
Mountains of Valais
Mountains of Haute-Savoie
International mountains of Europe
France–Switzerland border
Mountains of Switzerland